Estradiol/drospirenone (E2/DRSP), sold under the brand name Angeliq, is a combination of estradiol (E2), an estrogen, and drospirenone (DRSP), a progestin, antimineralocorticoid, and antiandrogen, which is used in menopausal hormone therapy, specifically the treatment of menopausal syndrome and osteoporosis, in postmenopausal women. It is taken by mouth and contains 0.5 to 1 mg E2 and 0.25 to 0.5 mg DRSP per tablet. The medication was approved in the United States in 2005. It is marketed widely throughout the world.

See also
 Estetrol/drospirenone
 Ethinylestradiol/drospirenone
 Ethinylestradiol/drospirenone/levomefolic acid
 Ethinylestradiol/drospirenone/prasterone
 List of combined sex-hormonal preparations § Estrogens and progestogens

References

External links
 Angeliq (estradiol/drospirenone) FDA Label
 Estradiol/drospirenone (Angeliq) - AdisInsight

Combined estrogen–progestogen formulations
Bayer brands